The chestnut-winged starling (Onychognathus fulgidus) is a species of starling in the family Sturnidae. It is found in Angola, Benin, Cameroon, Central African Republic, Republic of the Congo, Democratic Republic of the Congo, Ivory Coast, Equatorial Guinea, Gabon, Ghana, Guinea, Liberia, Nigeria, São Tomé and Príncipe, Sierra Leone, South Sudan Sudan, Tanzania, Togo, and Uganda. It also found in Kolkata India

References

chestnut-winged starling
Birds of Sub-Saharan Africa
Birds of the Gulf of Guinea
chestnut-winged starling
Taxonomy articles created by Polbot